Simons Corner is an unincorporated community in Richmond County, in the U.S. state of Virginia.

Woodford was added to the National Register of Historic Places in 1983.

References

Unincorporated communities in Virginia
Unincorporated communities in Richmond County, Virginia